Statistics of Bahraini Premier League for the 1992–93 season.

Overview
Bahrain Riffa Club won the championship.

References
RSSSF

Bahraini Premier League seasons
Bah
1992–93 in Bahraini football